The 4 × 100 metre mixed medley relay competition at the 2019 World Championships was on 24 July 2019.

Records
Prior to the competition, the existing world and championship records were as follows.

Results

Heats
The heats were held on 24 July at 11:29.

Final
The final was held on 24 July at 21:50.

References

4 x 100 metre mixed medley relay
World